His Infernal Majesty may refer to:
 Satan
 HIM (Finnish band), a Finnish metal band
 Infernäl Mäjesty, a Canadian metal band
 Him (The Powerpuff Girls), a cartoon villain

See also 
 Their Satanic Majesties Request